Arabis hirsuta, known as hairy rock-cress, is a flowering plant of the genus Arabis in the family Brassicaceae. In previous North American works, this species has been broadly defined to include plants native to Europe, Asia, and the northern half of North America, but is now more often restricted to a narrower subgroup restricted to Europe.

This erect, 15–60 cm (6-18 inches) high hairy plant is usually unbranched, with a long spike of flowers. Lower leaves form a rosette, the stalkless upper-leaves clasp the stem. The white petals are twice as long as the sepals, flowers June–August. The fruits are cylindrical and pressed close to the stem and the slightly winged seeds are reddish brown. The hairs are stiff and forking. The species grows on chalk slopes, dunes, hedgebanks, walls and rocks.

Conservation status in the UK is near threatened as of 2001.

Gallery

See also 

 List of Arabis species

References

External links
photo of herbarium specimen at Missouri Botanical Garden

Jepson Manual Treatment, University of California
United States Department of Agriculture Plants Profile

Calphotos Photo gallery, University of California
NBN Atlas, Arabis Hirsuta

hirsuta
Flora of Europe
Flora of Asia
Flora of North America